William Robert Peters (born January 13, 1965) is a Canadian professional ice hockey coach and former college player. He has served as head coach of the Carolina Hurricanes and Calgary Flames of the National Hockey League (NHL), Avtomobilist Yekaterinburg of the Kontinental Hockey League (KHL), as well as the Canada men's national ice hockey team .

Early life and career
Peters was born in Three Hills, Alberta, where he spent the first ten years of his life living on a cattle and grain farm. He then moved 
to Killam, where he began playing both ice hockey and baseball. At age 15, Peters broke his knee when he was run over on his bicycle by a car, an injury that hindered his intention to play professionally. He played two seasons for the Augustana Vikings, and one for the Red Deer College Kings, during which he won the 1989 Alberta Colleges Athletics Conference championship under future mentor Mike Babcock. After this, he began his managerial career coaching Killam's Junior B team at age 24 before moving to Texas for his wife's nursing job. Peters helped open San Antonio's first ice hockey rink, and held hockey schools every summer across the United States and Canada. He also played his only game as a professional in Texas as a last-minute replacement in 1996 for the Central Hockey League's San Antonio Iguanas.

Coaching career

Early career
Peters began his career during the 1989–90 season with his hometown Killam Wheat Kings as head coach. Starting in the 1996–97 season, he was named as an assistant coach for the Spokane Chiefs of the Western Hockey League (WHL). He served in that role through the end of the 2001–02 season. Peters then took his first head coaching job with the University of Lethbridge and guided its Pronghorns ice hockey team for three seasons from 2002–03 through 2004–05.

Spokane Chiefs
In June 2005, Peters was named head coach of the WHL's Spokane Chiefs. His team posted a 25–39–8 record in his first season before taking a step forward in 2006–07 season when the team posted a 36–28–8 regular season record and qualified for the WHL playoffs for the first time since 2004.

Spokane posted a franchise-best 50 regular season wins and 107 points in the 2007–08 season en route to a third-place finish in the WHL's Western Conference. The Chiefs went on to win 16 of 21 playoff games to claim the Ed Chynoweth Cup as WHL champions. Peters then guided the Chiefs to four consecutive victories to claim the Memorial Cup as Canadian Hockey League champions. In his three seasons with the Chiefs, Peters posted a 111–82–23 regular season record.

Rockford IceHogs
After the Chiefs won the 2008 Memorial Cup, Peters left Spokane and was named head coach of the Rockford IceHogs of the American Hockey League (AHL) on August 1, 2008. The IceHogs posted consecutive 40-win seasons and qualified for the Calder Cup playoffs in each of Peters' first two years with the team, going 40–34–6 in 2008–09 and 44–30–6 in 2009–10. In his final season with Rockford, Peters led the second-youngest team in the AHL to a 38–33–9 record.

Eight players who played for Rockford during Peters' tenure went on to win the Stanley Cup with the Chicago Blackhawks in 2010 or 2013: Niklas Hjalmarsson, Jordan Hendry, Antti Niemi, Corey Crawford, Kris Versteeg, Bryan Bickell, Nick Leddy, Brandon Bollig and Ben Smith.

Detroit Red Wings
On July 8, 2011, the NHL's Detroit Red Wings named Peters as an assistant coach. Peters worked primarily with the team's defencemen and penalty-killing units.

Carolina Hurricanes
On June 19, 2014, the Carolina Hurricanes announced that Peters had been hired to replace the vacant head coach position, previously held by Kirk Muller. On April 20, 2018, Peters resigned from his position.

Calgary Flames
On April 23, 2018, Peters was hired as head coach of the Calgary Flames. In his first season, he led the Flames to their first division title in 13 years, and the second-most wins (50) and points (107) in franchise history, behind only the Stanley Cup-winning 1988–89 Calgary Flames.  However, despite winning game one of their first round playoff series against the Colorado Avalanche, they would be upset and eliminated in five games.

Racism controversy and resignation

On November 25, 2019, an accusation of racism was made by former Rockford IceHogs player Akim Aliu on Twitter, alluding to racial profanities Peters directed towards him. Following this accusation, on November 26, a new Twitter accusation emerged from former Carolina Hurricanes player Michal Jordán, alleging that Peters had kicked him and punched another unnamed player during a game. On November 27, Peters did not take his place behind the Flames' bench for a game against the Buffalo Sabres, pending the outcome of an investigation by the Flames' management. Peters submitted his resignation on November 29, and Geoff Ward was named the interim head coach.

Avtomobilist Yekaterinburg
In April 2020 Peters was hired to be the coach of Russian hockey club Avtomobilist Yekaterinburg

On November 30, 2021 he was relieved of his duties.

International coaching career
Peters served as head coach of the gold medal-winning Canada men's national under-18 ice hockey team at the 2008 Ivan Hlinka Memorial Tournament. That under-18 team included future NHL stars Taylor Hall, Ryan O'Reilly, Brayden Schenn, Evander Kane and Matt Duchene, among others.

At the senior international level, Peters also served as head coach of Canada's gold medal-winning team at the 2016 IIHF World Championship, and he was an assistant coach for Canada's championship teams at the 2015 IIHF World Championship and 2016 World Cup of Hockey. On April 9, 2018, Hockey Canada announced that Peters would serve as Canada's head coach at the 2018 IIHF World Championship.

Head coaching record

References

External links
 
 Bill Peters' official Detroit Red Wings bio

1965 births
Living people
Canada men's national ice hockey team coaches
Canadian ice hockey coaches
Canadian ice hockey players
Calgary Flames coaches
Carolina Hurricanes coaches
Detroit Red Wings coaches
People from Kneehill County
San Antonio Iguanas players
Spokane Chiefs coaches
Canadian expatriate ice hockey players in the United States
University of Texas at San Antonio alumni
Ice hockey people from Alberta